Elymnias panthera, the tawny palmfly, is a butterfly in the family Nymphalidae. It was described by Johan Christian Fabricius in 1787. It is found in the Indomalayan realm.

Subspecies
Elymnias panthera panthera (Peninsular Malaysia, Singapore)
Elymnias panthera dusara Horsfield, [1829] (western Java)
Elymnias panthera dulcibella  Fruhstorfer, 1907 (eastern Java)
Elymnias panthera balina  Martin, 1909 (Bali)
Elymnias panthera lacrimosa  Fruhstorfer, 1898 (Bawean)
Elymnias panthera lacrima  Fruhstorfer, 1904 (Borneo)
Elymnias panthera tautra  Fruhstorfer, 1907 (Sumatra)
Elymnias panthera arikata  Fruhstorfer, 1907 (Natuna)
Elymnias panthera labuana  Staudinger, 1889 (northern Borneo)
Elymnias panthera alfredi  Fruhstorfer, 1907 (southern Borneo)
Elymnias panthera parce  Staudinger, 1889 (Palawan)
Elymnias panthera suluana  Fruhstorfer, 1899 (Sulu)
Elymnias panthera bangueyana  Fruhstorfer, 1899 (Banggai)
Elymnias panthera enganica  Doherty, 1891 (Enggano)
Elymnias panthera dolorosa  Butler, 1883 (Nias)
Elymnias panthera mimus  Wood-Mason & de Nicéville, 1881 (Nicobars)
Elymnias panthera tiomanica  Eliot, 1978 (Pulau Tioman)
Elymnias panthera winkleri  Kalis, 1933 (Sabang)

References

External links
"Elymnias Hübner, 1818" at Markku Savela's Lepidoptera and Some Other Life Forms

Elymnias
Butterflies described in 1787